General elections were held in Mali on 9 June 1985. The country was a one-party state at the time, with the Democratic Union of the Malian People (UDPM) as the sole legal party. Its leader, Moussa Traoré, was the only candidate in the presidential election, and was elected unopposed. In the National Assembly elections several UDPM candidates were able to contest each seat.

Results

President

National Assembly

References

1985 in Mali
Mali
Elections in Mali
Single-candidate elections
One-party elections
Presidential elections in Mali
Election and referendum articles with incomplete results